Othaña (possibly from Aymara for seat,) is a mountain in the western extensions of the Vilcanota mountain range in the Andes of Peru, about  high. It is situated in the Cusco Region, Canchis Province, Pitumarca District, east of Sibinacocha. Othaña lies southwest of Cóndor Tuco and Chuallani, west of Yana Orjo and north of Orco Puñuna.

References

Mountains of Cusco Region
Mountains of Peru